Jessica Gao (born January 2, 1984) is an American television writer and producer, who was creator and head writer of the TV series She-Hulk: Attorney at Law. She also worked on the third season of Rick and Morty, writing the episode "Pickle Rick", and wrote for Silicon Valley, Robot Chicken, The Mighty B!, Back at the Barnyard, Star Wars: Detours, and Kung Fu Panda: Legends of Awesomeness.

Career 
Gao started her career as a writer on the Nickelodeon shows The Mighty B! and Back at the Barnyard. She continued to work for the network on shows such as Big Time Rush and Kung Fu Panda: Legends of Awesomeness, before leaving to freelance on other shows such as Adult Swim's Robot Chicken, Cartoon Network's The High Fructose Adventures of Annoying Orange, and Disney XD's Lab Rats. Gao has also written for HBO's Silicon Valley, the French series Zip Zip, Seeso/Pluto TV's Bajillion Dollar Propertie$, and Comedy Central's Corporate.

She joined the writing room for the third season of Rick and Morty, acting as story editor on six episodes and writing the episode "Pickle Rick". For writing "Pickle Rick", Gao won the Primetime Emmy for Outstanding Animated Program at the 2018 Primetime Creative Arts Emmy Awards. While working on the show, Gao and the other female writers were subject to sexual harassment by members of the fanbase that were upset about the show hiring women in the writing room. Gao and Rick and Morty co-creator, Dan Harmon, collaborated on a podcast series entitled "Whiting Wongs" that discussed race and privilege in Hollywood. Gao also wrote and co-executive produced the second season of the show Take My Wife.

Gao left Rick and Morty after the third season to develop a sitcom for ABC, which landed a pilot episode order in 2019, directed by Jude Weng. The show revolved around a Chinese-American woman's relationship with her family. ABC passed on the sitcom, but the series was being shopped to other networks. In July 2019, she was chosen to write the script for the upcoming movie based on Sweet Valley High. In November 2019, she was hired as the lead writer for the Disney+ show She-Hulk: Attorney at Law.

Personal life 
Gao is engaged to Truck Torrence, who is known for creating emojis of Marvel characters under the name 100 Soft.

Filmography

Awards and nominations

References

External links 

Living people
1984 births
American television writers
American women screenwriters
American women television writers
Television producers from California
American women television producers
American writers of Chinese descent
21st-century American women writers
21st-century American screenwriters
People from Hanford, California
Screenwriters from California